Child's Play is a 2009 novel by the British-Asian author Kia Abdullah.

Plot 
A psychological crime thriller, Child's Play follows the story of 25-year-old Allegra Ashe who, after a chance encounter with an alluring stranger, is recruited into 'Vokoban', a covert government unit that uses a mysterious new law to chase and convict paedophiles. Allegra becomes deeply involved with the unit and so begins her descent into the darkness and depravity of the human mind. As her life spirals out of control, the reader becomes a voyeur in a world of lust, danger, deceit and revenge.

The plot explores certain controversial themes such as rape and paedophilia. Having faced a degree of controversy over her first novel, Life, Love and Assimilation, Abdullah is unsure how her second novel will be received: "It's ultra violent and ultra sexual, and there are some morally ambiguous sex scenes in there, so I don't know how people will react to that," she says on her website.

She adds:

In 2011 the Telegraph commented that her two controversial novels, Life Love and Assimilation and Child’s Play drew condemnation from the British Bangladeshi community.

References

External links 
Kia Abdullah's Official Site

2009 novels
Novels about child sexual abuse